Dança dos Famosos 5 was the fifth season of Brazilian reality television show Dança dos Famosos which premiered February 24, 2008 and ended May 11, 2008 on the Rede Globo television network.

Ten celebrities were paired with ten professional ballroom dancers. Fausto Silva and Adriana Colin were the hosts for this season.

Actress Christiane Torloni won the competition over Malhação Cast Member Rafael Almeida.

Overview

 The season follows the same split-by-gender style from the last couple of seasons. It was the last season to feature the semi-final four-down-to-two format, as well a Final Two in Finale Night.
 At 51, Christiane Torloni became the oldest winner in the history of the show. Ironically, she beat Rafael Almeida, who at 18, is the youngest finalist and contestant that the show ever had.

Couples
The ten professionals and celebrities that competed were:

Scoring Chart

Red numbers indicate the couples with the lowest score for each week.
Green numbers indicate the couples with the highest score for each week.

 indicates the couple (or couples) eliminated that week.
 indicates the returning couple that finished in the bottom two.
 indicates the couple withdrew from the competition.
 indicates the couple that would have been eliminated had an elimination taken place.
 indicates the semifinal winning couple.
 indicates the wild card winning couple.
 indicates the winning couple.
 indicates the runner-up couple.

Average Chart

This table only counts dances scored on the traditional 50-point scale.

Call-Out Order
The table below lists the order in which the contestants' fates will be revealed by Faustão.

 The celebrity did not perform
 The celebrity was brought back into the competition, but had to withdraw
 The celebrity was eliminated
 The celebrity won the competition

 Episode 5 was the wild card round.

Weekly results

Week 1 
Week 1 – Men
Style: Bolero
Aired: February 24, 2008

Week 2 
Week 1 – Women
Style: Bolero
Aired: March 2, 2008

Week 3 
Week 2 – Men
Style: Merengue
Aired: March 9, 2008

Week 4 
Week 2 – Women
Style: Merengue
Aired: March 16, 2008

Week 5 
Repechage
Style: Gypsy
Aired: March 23, 2008

Week 6 
Top 7
Style: Forró
Aired: March 30, 2008

Week 7 
Top 6
Style: Lambada
Aired: April 6, 2008

Week 8 
Top 5
Style: Paso Doble
Aired: April 13, 2008

Week 9 
Top 4 – Week 1
Style: Maxixe
Aired: April 20, 2008

Week 10 
Top 3 – Week 2
Style: Hip Hop
Aired: April 27, 2008

Week 11 
Top 2
Style: Samba & Tango
Aired: May 11, 2008

Dance Chart

 Highest Scoring Dance
 Lowest Scoring Dance
 Withdrawn Dance (Not Performed/Scored)

References

External links
 Official Site 

Season 05
2008 Brazilian television seasons

pt:Dança dos Famosos 5